Ceramaster is a genus of cushion stars in the family Goniasteridae. The species in this genus have no arms. They live in deeper waters than most sea stars.

Species list
Species in this genus include:

Ceramaster arcticus (Verrill, 1909) - Arctic cookie star
Ceramaster australis H.E.S. Clark, 2001
Ceramaster bowersi (Fisher, 1906)
Ceramaster clarki Fisher, 1910
Ceramaster cuenoti (Koehler, 1909)
Ceramaster glasbyi McKnight, 1993
Ceramaster granularis (Retzius, 1783)
Ceramaster grenadensis (Perrier, 1881)
Ceramaster japonicus (Sladen, 1889)
Ceramaster lennoxkingi McKnight, 1973
Ceramaster leptoceramus (Fisher, 1905)
Ceramaster misakiensis (Goto, 1914)
Ceramaster mortenseni (Koehler, 1909)
Ceramaster patagonicus (Sladen, 1889) - Cookie star
Ceramaster smithi Fisher, 1913
Ceramaster stellatus Djakonov, 1950
Ceramaster trispinosus H.L. Clark, 1923

 
Note: Ceramaster placenta Fisher, 1911 is now accepted as Peltaster placenta (Müller & Troschel, 1842)

References

External links

 Genus Ceramaster
 Ceramaster info

Goniasteridae